Heart of the World is a 2018 Russian-Lithuanianian drama film directed and written by Nataliya Meshchaninova. The film won the Grand Prix at the Kinotavr-2018 festival.

Plot 
The film tells about the veterinarian Yegor, who works at a training station for hunting dogs. The world of animals is his world, it is much easier for him to find a common language with animals than with people. Egor dreams of becoming part of the family of Nikolai Ivanovich, the owner of the station, and for this he is ready to do anything.

Cast
 Stepan Devonin as Egor
 Dmitriy Podnozov
 Yana Sekste
 Ekaterina Vasiljeva
 Viktor Ovodkov
 Evgeniy Sytyy
 Aleksey Chubkin
 Giuliano Di Capua
 Aleksey Kashnikov
 Elena Papanova
 Darya Saveleva

References

External links 
 

2018 films
Russian drama films
2010s Russian-language films
Lithuanian drama films